This is the discography of Pimp C, an American rapper, and one half of Southern hip hop group UGK, along with Bun B.

Albums

Studio albums

Posthumous studio albums

Compilation albums

Singles

As lead artist

As featured artist

Other charted songs

Guest appearances

Music videos

Documentaries

References

Hip hop discographies
Discographies of American artists